Bunaeopsis phidias is a moth of the  family Saturniidae. It is known from Africa, including Tanzania, Eritrea, Malawi and Zambia.

The ground colour of the forewings is a yellowish brown.

References

Saturniinae
Moths described in 1909
Moths of Africa